Surendrajeet Singh Ahluwalia (born 4 July 1951) is an Indian politician of the Bharatiya Janata Party (BJP), and a senior Member of Parliament in his 32nd year as a Parliamentarian.

A former Union Minister of State in the Government of India, he is the member of Parliament of India representing Bardhaman-Durgapur Lok Sabha constituency in West Bengal in the 17th Lok Sabha (2019-2024). He represented   Darjeeling , West Bengal in the 16th Lok Sabha, having been elected as its MP in the 2014 General Elections. Prior to entering the Lok Sabha in 2014, he was a Member of Parliament representing Bihar and Jharkhand in the Rajya Sabha, the upper house of the Indian Parliament over several terms, 1986–1992, 1992–1998 (as a member of Congress), and with BJP in 2000–2006, and 2006–2012. 

During his term in the Rajya Sabha, he was Deputy Leader of the Opposition in the Rajya Sabha till 2012, and Chief Whip prior to that.  After being elected into Lok Sabha in 2014, he has held various portfolios as Minister of State from 2016 to GE 2019.

Education
Ahluwalia is a lawyer by education. having graduated from Calcutta University.

Political career

Ahluwalia was a Member of Parliament from Rajya Sabha representing Bihar and Jharkhand in 1986-1992, 1992-1998, 2000–2006, and 2006-2012. He was elected to the Lok Sabha from the Darjeeling Parliamentary Constituency of West Bengal with active support of a local unrecognized party Gorkha Janmukti Morcha in May 2014.

He was first elected to the Rajya Sabha from Bihar in 1986 as a member of the Indian National Congress, and in the early years of his career, held the posts of Minister for Urban Development, and Minister of Parliamentary Affairs in the Union Government headed by P. V. Narasimha Rao. He subsequently joined BJP in 1999, where he has been since.

He served as Minister of State for Urban Affairs and Employment (Department of Urban Employment and Poverty Alleviation) and Parliamentary Affairs in P V Narasimha Rao Cabinet from 15 September 1995 to 16 May 1996. He was Deputy Leader of the Opposition in the Rajya Sabha from June 2010 to May 2012. He was inducted into the Union Council of Ministers as a Minister of State for Agriculture and Farmers Welfare and Parliamentary Affairs on 5 July 2016.

Positions held
 
 1984 - 86	Member, the G.S. Dhillon Committee constituted by Government of India for providing relief and rehabilitation to the victims of the November 1984 riots in the country
 1986 - 92	Member, Consultative Committee for the Ministry of Science and Technology Member, General Council of the Indian School of Mines, Dhanbad
 1987 - 88	Member, Select Committee on Medical Council Bill
 April 2000 - 2001	Member, Consultative Committee for the Ministry of Agriculture
 Sept 2000 - Aug 2004	 Member, Committee on Finance
 2001 Member, Consultative Committee for the Ministry of Information Technology
 Aug 2001 - April 2006 and June 2006 onwards Member, Business Advisory Committee
 Jan 2002 - Feb. 2004	Member, Consultative Committee for the Ministry of Communications and Information Technology
 Aug 2002 - Aug. 2004	 Member, Committee on Information Technology
 Jan 2003 - July 2004	 Member, Committee of Privileges
 Aug 2004 - April 2006 and May 2006 onwards	 Member, Committee on Home Affairs
 Aug 2004 - April 2006 and June 2006 onwards	 Member, House Committee
 Sept 2004 - Oct 2007	Member, National Monitoring Committee for Minorities Education
 Oct 2004 - 2006	Member, Consultative Committee for the Ministry of Finance
 June 2006 - Sept 2006	Member, Committee on Rules
 Sept 2006 onwards	Member, Committee of Privileges
 April 2007 onwards	Convenor, Sub-Committee on Civil Defence and Rehabilitation of J and K Migrants of the Committee on Home Affairs
 Sept 2007 onwards  Member, Committee on Finance & Member, Consultative Committee for the Ministry of Communications and Information Technology

Speeches and other contributions in international forums
 1989 - Attended the United Nations High Commission for Refugees (UNHCR) Human Rights Conference in Geneva, Switzerland as Alternate Leader of the Indian Delegation.

Speech Transcripts from the Conference:
Violation of Human Rights in the Occupied Arab Territories including Palestine Speech Transcript
Right to Development Speech Transcript
Human Rights and Fundamental Freedoms Speech Transcript
Torture and Enforced Disappearances Speech Transcript
Report of Sub-Commission Speech Transcript
Freedom of Religion Speech Transcript

 2002 - Attended the United Nations General Assembly (UNGA) in New York, USA as a Delegate.

Speech Transcripts from the Conference:
Promotion and Protection of the Rights of Children Speech Transcript
Social Development including questions relating to the World Speech Transcript
Gender Equality, development and peace for the 21st Century Speech Transcript

 2002 - Attended the International Parliamentarians Association for Information Technology (IPAIT) I Conference in Seoul, Korea as Chair of the Steering Committee and  moderated over Theme 2. Joint Communiqué
 2002 - Attended the Commonwealth Parliamentary Association Conference in Windhoek, Namibia as Leader of the Indian Delegation.    Speech Transcript
 2008 - Attended the International Parliamentarians Association for Information Technology (IPAIT) VI Conference in Sofia, Bulgaria as Vice-President of IPAIT. Joint Communiqué
 2010 - IPU: (i) Served as Reporteur in the First Standing Committee on Peace & International Security in the 109th Assembly of IPU in Geneva.  (ii) Served as Vice-President of the Standing Committee on Democracy and Human Rights in the 122nd IPU Assembly in Bangkok, Thailand.  
 2012 April -  Farewell speech in the Rajya Sabha upon his retirement.

Joint Parliamentary Committees (JPC)
 Aug 1992  -  Member of Joint Parliamentary Committee to inquire into Irregularities in Securities and Banking Transactions
 April 2001 - Member of Joint Parliamentary Committee on Stock Market Scam and matters relating thereto
 August 2003 - Member of Joint Parliamentary Committee on pesticide residues in food products and safety standards for soft drinks, fruit juices and other beverages
 JPC on Pesticide residue in soft drinks
 Report on Pesticide residue in soft drinks
 March 2011 - Member of Joint Parliamentary Committee to probe the irregular allocation of 2G Spectrum
 June 2015 - Chairman, Joint Committee of Parliament to look into provisions of Land Acquisition Amendment Bill 2015

References

External links
 Shri S.S. Ahluwalia - Profile

Living people
1951 births
Narendra Modi ministry
India MPs 2014–2019
Lok Sabha members from West Bengal
Bharatiya Janata Party politicians from West Bengal
Rajya Sabha members from Bihar
Rajya Sabha members from Jharkhand
Indian National Congress politicians
People from Paschim Bardhaman district
People from West Bengal
University of Calcutta alumni
Punjabi people
Indian Sikhs
People from Asansol
India MPs 2019–present
Rajya Sabha members from the Bharatiya Janata Party
Ahluwalia